The following is the list of squads for each of the 23 teams that competed in the men's basketball tournament at the 1952 Summer Olympics.

Argentina

The following players represented Argentina:

 Alberto López
 Hugo del Vecchio
 Ignacio Poletti
 Juan Gazsó
 Juan Uder
 Leopoldo Contarbio
 Omar Monza
 Oscar Furlong
 Rafael Lledó
 Raúl Pérez
 Ricardo González
 Roberto Viau
 Rubén Menini
 Rubén Pagliari

Belgium

The following players represented Belgium:

 Alexis Van Gils
 Désiré Ligon
 Félix Roosemont
 Henri Coosemans
 Henri Crick
 Jan Ceulemans
 Johannes Ducheyne
 Josef du Jardin
 Jef Eygel
 Jules Boes
 Julien Meuris
 Yvan Delsarte

Brazil

The following players represented Brazil:

 Alfredo da Motta
 Almir
 Angelim
 Godinho
 Bráz
 Zé Luiz
 Mário Jorge
 Mayr Facci
 Raymundo dos Santos
 Ruy de Freitas
 Tião
 Thales
 Algodão

Bulgaria

The following players represented Bulgaria:

 Gencho Khristov
 Georgi Panov
 Iliya Georgiev
 Kiril Semov
 Konstantin Georgiev
 Konstantin Totev
 Neycho Neychev
 Veselin Penkov
 Vladimir Savov
 Vasil Manchenko
 Anton Kuzov
 Khristo Donchev
 Petar Shishkov
 Ivan Nikolov

Canada

The following players represented Canada:

 Bernard Pickel
 Chuck Dalton
 George Wearring
 Glen Pettinger
 Harry Wade
 Carl Ridd
 Woody Campbell
 Bob Phibbs
 Bobby Simpson
 Roy Williams
 Bill Pataky
 Bill Coulthard

Chile

The following players represented Chile:

 Álvaro Salvadores
 Eduardo Cordero
 Eric Mahn
 Exequiel Figueroa
 Hernán Raffo
 Hernán Ramos
 Hugo Fernández
 Juan José Gallo
 Juan Ostoic
 Orlando Silva
 Pedro Araya
 Rufino Bernedo
 Victor Mahaña

Cuba

The following players represented Cuba:

 Alberto Escoto
 Alfredo Faget
 Armando Estrada
 Carlos Bea
 Casimiro García
 Fabio Ruíz
 Fico López
 Felipe de la Pozas
 Juan García
 Mario Quintero
 Ramón Wiltz
 Raúl García

Czechoslovakia

The following players represented Czechoslovakia:

 Eugen Horniak
 Ivan Mrázek
 Jan Kozák
 Jaroslav Šíp
 Jiří Baumruk
 Jiří Matoušek
 Josef Ezr
 Luboš Kolář
 Miloslav Kodl
 Miroslav Baumruk
 Miroslav Škeřík
 Zdeněk Bobrovský
 Zdeněk Rylich

Egypt

The following players represented Egypt:

 Abdel Rahman Hafez Ismail
 Albert Tadros
 Armand Catafago
 Fouad Abdel Meguid El-Kheir
 Raymond Sabounghi
 George Chalhoub
 Hussain Montassir
 Youssef Mohamed
 Mohamed Medhat Bahgat
 Mohamed Ali Ahmed El-Rashidy
 Sami Mansour
 Youssef Abou Ouf
 Youssef Abbas
 Zaki Harari

Finland

The following players represented Finland:

 Eero Salonen
 Esko Karhunen
 Kalevi Heinänen
 Tapio Pöyhönen
 Juhani Kyöstilä
 Oiva Virtanen
 Pentti Laaksonen
 Pertti Mutru
 Raimo Lindholm
 Raine Nuutinen
 Timo Suviranta

France

The following players represented France:

 André Buffière
 André Chavet
 André Vacheresse
 Bernard Planque
 Jacques Dessemme
 Robert Monclar
 Jean Perniceni
 Jean-Paul Beugnot
 Jean-Pierre Salignon
 Louis Devoti
 René Chocat
 Robert Crost
 Robert Guillin
 Roger Haudegand

Greece

The following players represented Greece:

 Alexandros Spanoudakis
 Aristeidis Roubanis
 Mimis Stefanidis
 Dimitrios Taliadoros
 Ioannis Lambrou
 Ioannis Spanoudakis
 Konstantinos Papadimas
 Nikolaos Milas
 Panagiotis Manias
 Faidon Matthaiou
 Stelios Arvanitis
 Themis Cholevas

Hungary

The following players represented Hungary:

 Ede Komáromi
 György Bokor
 György Telegdy
 János Simon
 László Bánhegyi
 László Hódi
 Pál Bogár
 Péter Papp
 Tibor Cselkó
 Tibor Mezőfi
 Tibor Zsíros
 János Greminger
 Tibor Czinkán

Israel

The following players represented Israel:

 Abraham Shneior
 Amos Lin
 Dan Erez
 Daniel Levy
 Eliahu Amiel
 Yehuda Gafni
 Menahem Degani
 Mordechai Hefez
 Ralph Klein
 Reuben Perach
 Shimon Shelah
 Zekaarya Ofri

Italy

The following players represented Italy:

 Achille Canna
 Carlo Cerioni
 Dino Zucchi
 Enrico Pagani
 Fabio Presca
 Federico Marietti
 Giordano Damiani
 Giorgio Bongiovanni
 Luigi Rapini
 Renzo Ranuzzi
 Sergio Ferriani
 Sergio Marelli
 Sergio Stefanini

Mexico

The following players represented Mexico:

Philippines

The following players represented the Philippines:

 Antonio Genato
 Antonio Martínez
 Antonio Tantay
 Carlos Loyzaga
 Eduardo Lim
 Florentino Bautista
 José Gochangco
 Mariano Tolentino
 Meliton Santos
 Ponciano Saldaña
 Rafael Hechanova
 Ramón Campos

Romania

The following players represented Romania:

 Adrian Petroșanu
 Andrei Folbert
 Cezar Niculescu
 Cornel Călugăreanu
 Dan Niculescu
 Emanoil Răducanu
 Gheorghe Constantinide
 Grigore Costescu
 Ladislau Mokos
 Liviu Naghy
 Mihai Nedef
 Vasile Popescu

Soviet Union

The following players represented the Soviet Union:

 Viktor Vlasov
 Stepas Butautas
 Joann Lõssov
 Kazys Petkevičius
 Nodar Jorjik'ia
 Anatoly Konev
 Otar Korkia
 Ilmar Kullam
 Yury Ozerov
 Aleksandr Moiseyev
 Heino Kruus
 Justinas Lagunavičius
 Maigonis Valdmanis
 Stasys Stonkus

Switzerland

The following players represented Switzerland:

 Bernard Schmied
 Georges Stockly
 Gérald Cottier
 Henri Baumann
 Jacques Redard
 Jean-Pierre Voisin
 Marcos Bossy
 Marcel Moget
 Maurice Chollet
 Pierre Albrecht
 René Chiappino
 René Wohler
 Roger Domenjoz
 Roger Prahin

Turkey

The following players represented Turkey:

 Ali Uras
 Altan Dinçer
 Erdoğan Partener
 Mehmet Ali Yalım
 Nejat Diyarbakırlı
 Sacit Seldüz
 Sadi Gülçelik
 Turhan Tezol
 Yalçın Granit
 Yılmaz Gündüz
 Yüksel Alkan

United States

The following players represented the United States:

 Charlie Hoag
 Bill Hougland
 Dean Kelley
 Bob Kenney
 Clyde Lovellette
 Marc Freiberger
 Wayne Glasgow
 Frank McCabe
 Dan Pippin
 Howie Williams
 Ron Bontemps
 Bob Kurland
 Bill Lienhard
 John Keller

Uruguay

The following players represented Uruguay:

 Martín Acosta y Lara
 Enrique Baliño
 Victorio Cieslinskas
 Héctor Costa
 Nelson Demarco
 Héctor García
 Roberto Lovera
 Adesio Lombardo
 Tabaré Borges
 Sergio Matto
 Wilfredo Peláez
 Carlos Roselló

References

1952 Summer Olympics